"Say Say Say (Waiting 4 U)" is a song by Dutch house music group Hi Tack, released in the United Kingdom on 16 January 2006. It samples the 1983 song "Say Say Say" by Paul McCartney and Michael Jackson. The song peaked at number three in Finland, number four in the United Kingdom, and number eight in Ireland.

Track listing
 "Say Say Say (Waiting 4 U)" (radio edit) – 2:44
 "Say Say Say (Waiting 4 U)" (original) –  7:34
 "Say Say Say (Waiting 4 U)" (Tocadisco's Not Guilty remix) – 5:46
 "Say Say Say (Waiting 4 U)" (Delano Crocketts Late Nite dub mix) – 3:20
 "Beats 4 U" (Groeneveld & Van der Zwan)

Charts

Weekly charts

Year-end charts

Release history

References

2005 songs
2006 debut singles
Songs written by Paul McCartney
Songs written by Michael Jackson
Spinnin' Records singles